Keith Robert Mustow (born 26 November 1972) is a former English cricketer.  Mustow was a left-handed batsman.  He was born in Cirencester, Gloucestershire.

Mustow made his debut for Oxfordshire in the 1995 Minor Counties Championship against Devon.  Mustow played Minor counties cricket for Oxfordshire from 1995 to 2006, which included 43 Minor Counties Championship matches and 19 MCCA Knockout Trophy matches.  He made his List A debut against Lancashire in the 1996 NatWest Trophy.  He played 3 further List A matches, the last coming against Shropshire in the 2nd round of the 2002 Cheltenham & Gloucester Trophy which was held in 2001.  In his 4 List A matches he scored 29 runs at a batting average of 7.25, with a high score of 13.

He has previously played for the Gloucestershire Second XI.

References

External links
Keith Mustow at ESPNcricinfo
Keith Mustow at CricketArchive

1972 births
Living people
People from Cirencester
English cricketers
Oxfordshire cricketers
Sportspeople from Gloucestershire